"Hold On (To My Love)" is a song written by Robin Gibb and Blue Weaver and performed by American soul singer Jimmy Ruffin, released in 1980 on his album Sunrise. It reached #10 in the US, #29 R&B and #7 in the UK.

Personnel
Jimmy Ruffin - lead and backing vocals
Blue Weaver - keyboards, synthesizer
Bobby Cadway - guitar
George Perry - backing vocals, bass
Dennis Bryon - backing vocals, drums
Yvonne Levis, Janet Wright & Krystal Davis - backing vocals
Glen Kolotkin - engineer

Chart performance

References 

1980 singles
Jimmy Ruffin songs
Songs written by Robin Gibb
Songs written by Blue Weaver
Song recordings produced by Robin Gibb
Disco songs
Funk songs
1980 songs
RSO Records singles